The Clifton Townsite Historic District, in Clifton, Arizona, is a  historic district that was listed on the National Register of Historic Places in 1990.

It is historically significant as "a largely intact area within Clifton, a copper mining town in eastern Arizona which developed between 1870 and 1930. The district is significant...for its
association with the early copper mining and smelting operations in that region and with the town which grew to support those operations; it is additionally significant...for its intact examples of
architecture typical of Arizona's mining towns of the day."

It is located at the confluence of Chase Creek and the San Francisco River.  The Park Avenue Bridge over the San Francisco River, and the Clifton Casa Grande Building, which are both individually listed on the National Register, are included in the district.

The district includes Prairie School, Late Victorian, and Mission/Spanish Revival architecture.  The district includes 41 contributing buildings, two contributing sites, and nine contributing structures.

See also

 National Register of Historic Places listings in Greenlee County, Arizona

References

External links

 Clifton (Historic Main Street Only) – ghosttowns.com

Historic districts on the National Register of Historic Places in Arizona
Victorian architecture in Arizona
Mission Revival architecture in Arizona
Prairie School architecture in Arizona
Geography of Greenlee County, Arizona
History of Greenlee County, Arizona
Tourist attractions in Greenlee County, Arizona
National Register of Historic Places in Greenlee County, Arizona
Ghost towns in Arizona